"Bangin' on Wax: Greatest Hits" is a compilation album by rap group, Bloods & Crips.  The album was released on August 27, 1996 for Dangerous Records. The album was produced entirely by Ron "Ronnie Ron" Phillips and written by Bloods & Crips members.

Track listing

References 

Bloods & Crips albums
1996 greatest hits albums
Hip hop compilation albums
Gangsta rap compilation albums
G-funk compilation albums